Lady Bird is a 2017 American coming-of-age comedy-drama film written and directed by Greta Gerwig. Set in Sacramento, California, the film follows Christine "Lady Bird" McPherson (Saoirse Ronan), a high-school senior, and her turbulent relationship with her mother (Laurie Metcalf). It also stars Tracy Letts, Lucas Hedges, Timothée Chalamet, Beanie Feldstein, Stephen McKinley Henderson, and Lois Smith.

The film premiered at the Telluride Film Festival on September 1, 2017. A24 began a limited release in the United States on November 3, 2017, before expanding to a wide release on November 24. Its $91,109 per theater average was the second highest opening average of the year and the highest-ever for a film in limited release directed by a woman. The film has so far earned $31.4 million at the worldwide box office, against a production budget of $10 million. Rotten Tomatoes, a review aggregator, surveyed 214 reviews and judged 99% of them to be positive. On November 27, 2017, the film became the most-reviewed film ever to remain at 100% on the site with 164 positive reviews, beating previous record holder Toy Story 2, which has 163 positive reviews. It stayed at 100% until 196 registered reviews. Metacritic calculated a weighted average score of 94 out of 100 based on 48 reviews, indicating "universal acclaim".

Lady Bird received praise for Ronan and Metcalf's performances, as well as Gerwig's screenplay and direction. It was selected by the American Film Institute as one of its ten Movies of the Year. National Board of Review listed the film in its 2017 Top Ten Films, with Gerwig and Metcalf winning the Best Director and Best Supporting Actress awards, respectively. The film garnered four nominations at the 75th Golden Globe Awards, winning Best Motion Picture – Musical or Comedy and Best Actress – Musical or Comedy for Ronan. It received eight nominations at the 23rd Critics' Choice Awards, including Best Picture, Best Director, Best Actress, Best Supporting Actress, Best Original Screenplay, and Best Acting Ensemble.

Lady Bird garnered four nominations at the 33rd Independent Spirit Awards: Best Feature, Best Female Lead, Best Supporting Female, and Best Screenplay. At the 24th Screen Actors Guild Awards, it was nominated for Outstanding Performance by a Female Actor in a Leading Role for Ronan, Outstanding Performance by a Female Actor in a Supporting Role for Metcalf, and Outstanding Performance by a Cast in a Motion Picture.

Accolades

Notes

See also
 2017 in film

References

External links
 

Lists of accolades by film